Teke Oruh (born August 8, 1978), alias African Prince, is a Nigerian former professional boxer who competed from 2001 to 2010.

Amateur
Oruh won Bronze at the 1999 All-Africa Games.

Professional career
Oruh made his professional debut, a first-round knockout of Gustavo Robleto, on July 28, 2001. To date his professional record is 14 wins (6 by knockout) and one loss with 1 draw after getting outpointed by Joey Abell on Showtime.

Professional boxing record

|-
|align="center" colspan=8|14 Wins (6 knockouts, 8 decisions), 3 Losses (1 knockout, 2 decisions), 1 Draw 
|-
| align="center" style="border-style: none none solid solid; background: #e3e3e3"|Result
| align="center" style="border-style: none none solid solid; background: #e3e3e3"|Record
| align="center" style="border-style: none none solid solid; background: #e3e3e3"|Opponent
| align="center" style="border-style: none none solid solid; background: #e3e3e3"|Type
| align="center" style="border-style: none none solid solid; background: #e3e3e3"|Round
| align="center" style="border-style: none none solid solid; background: #e3e3e3"|Date
| align="center" style="border-style: none none solid solid; background: #e3e3e3"|Location
| align="center" style="border-style: none none solid solid; background: #e3e3e3"|Notes
|-align=center
|Loss
|
|align=left| Alexander Povetkin
|KO
|5
|16/10/2010
|align=left| Chekhov, Russia
|align=left|
|-
|Loss
|
|align=left| Manuel Quezada
|UD
|10
|29/11/2008
|align=left| Ontario, California, U.S.
|align=left|
|-
|Loss
|
|align=left| Joey Abell
|MD
|10
|16/11/2007
|align=left| Gros Islet, Saint Lucia
|align=left|
|-
|Win
|
|align=left| Jason Gavern
|MD
|6
|24/05/2007
|align=left| San Jose, California, U.S.
|align=left|
|-
|Win
|
|align=left| John Clark
|MD
|6
|22/02/2007
|align=left| Lemoore, California, U.S.
|align=left|
|-
|Win
|
|align=left| Willie Perryman
|TKO
|6
|14/09/2006
|align=left| San Jose, California, U.S.
|align=left|
|-
|Win
|
|align=left| Shaun Tyrone Ross
|UD
|4
|20/07/2006
|align=left| San Jose, California, U.S.
|align=left|
|-
|Win
|
|align=left| David Johnson
|UD
|4
|03/03/2006
|align=left| Temecula, California, U.S.
|align=left|
|-
|Win
|
|align=left| Douglas Robertson
|KO
|1
|15/12/2005
|align=left| Lemoore, California, U.S.
|align=left|
|-
|Win
|
|align=left| Shaun Tyrone Ross
|TKO
|3
|29/04/2005
|align=left| Las Vegas, Nevada, U.S.
|align=left|
|-
|Win
|
|align=left| Marcelino Novaes
|UD
|6
|27/08/2004
|align=left| Las Vegas, Nevada, U.S.
|align=left|
|-
|Win
|
|align=left| Lee Lark
|TKO
|1
|21/11/2003
|align=left| Whittier, California, U.S.
|align=left|
|-
|Win
|
|align=left| Marcus Harvey
|UD
|6
|10/05/2003
|align=left| Hollywood, California, U.S.
|align=left|
|-
|Win
|
|align=left| Emanuel Laurents
|UD
|4
|08/03/2003
|align=left| Tustin, California, U.S.
|align=left|
|-
|Win
|
|align=left| Gerardo Yanez
|KO
|1
|24/01/2003
|align=left| Ventura, California, U.S.
|align=left|
|-
|Draw
|
|align=left| Derek Berry
|PTS
|4
|01/02/2002
|align=left| Phoenix, Arizona, U.S.
|align=left|
|-
|Win
|
|align=left| Hector Ferreyro
|UD
|4
|21/08/2001
|align=left| Tempe, Arizona, U.S.
|align=left|
|-
|Win
|
|align=left| Gustavo Robleto
|TKO
|1
|28/07/2001
|align=left| Fort Myers, Florida, U.S.
|align=left|
|}

External links

Heavyweight boxers
Living people
1978 births
Sportspeople from Lagos
Nigerian male boxers
African Games bronze medalists for Nigeria
African Games medalists in boxing
Competitors at the 1999 All-Africa Games